Nelson Cruz (born September 13, 1972) is a Dominican former professional baseball pitcher. He played all or parts of six seasons in Major League Baseball (MLB) for the Chicago White Sox, Detroit Tigers, Houston Astros, and Colorado Rockies, and one season in Korea Professional Baseball for the SK Wyverns. He is currently the pitching coach for the Eugene Emeralds, the Class A Short Season affiliate of the San Diego Padres.

Career

References

 Career statistics from Korea Baseball Organization

1972 births
Living people
Águilas Cibaeñas players
Birmingham Barons players
Bristol White Sox players
Calgary Cannons players
Chicago White Sox players
Colorado Rockies players
Colorado Springs Sky Sox players
Detroit Tigers players
Dominican Republic baseball coaches
Dominican Republic expatriate baseball players in Canada
Dominican Republic expatriate baseball players in Italy
Dominican Republic expatriate baseball players in Mexico
Dominican Republic expatriate baseball players in South Korea
Dominican Republic expatriate baseball players in the United States
Dominican Republic national baseball team people
Gulf Coast Expos players
Hickory Crawdads players
Houston Astros players
Major League Baseball pitchers
Major League Baseball players from the Dominican Republic
Mexican League baseball pitchers
Minor league baseball coaches
Nashville Sounds players
New Orleans Zephyrs players
Prince William Cannons players
SSG Landers players
Toledo Mud Hens players
Toros de Tijuana players